John "Jack" Ogden (5 March 1923 – 2 July 2000) was an English professional rugby league footballer who played in the 1940s and 1950s. He played at club level for Featherstone Rovers (Heritage № 227).

Playing career
Jack Ogden was born in Leeds, West Riding of Yorkshire, England.

Playing career
Jack Ogden made his début for Featherstone Rovers on Saturday 9 September 1944.

Testimonial match
Jack Ogden's benefit season at Featherstone Rovers took place during the 1954–55 season.

Genealogical information
Jack Ogden is the older brother of the rugby league footballer who played in the 1950s for Featherstone Rovers (Heritage № 328); Maurice Ogden.

References

External links

Search for "Ogden" at rugbyleagueproject.org
A FEATHERSTONE ROVERS BLOG: Testimonials and Benefit Seasons.
A FEATHERSTONE ROVERS BLOG: June 2013
A FEATHERSTONE ROVERS BLOG: Featherstone Rovers Families ...
A FEATHERSTONE ROVERS BLOG: Ken Welburn
A FEATHERSTONE ROVERS BLOG: Albany Longley, Ralph Asquith ...

1923 births
2000 deaths
English rugby league players
Featherstone Rovers players
Rugby league players from Leeds